Paolo Poli (May 23, 1929 – March 25, 2016) was an Italian theatre actor. He has also acted in films and on television.

Career 
After a university degree in French literature, Poli began his acting career in the early 1950s and was one of the first actors in Italy to perform en travesti roles. He is considered to be one of the greatest and most versatile  of Italian theatrical actors.

He has acted in and directed a host of operettas, among which Aldino mi cali un filino, Rita of Cascia, Caterina de Medici, L'asino d'oro, Gulliver's Travels, La leggenda di San Gregorio, Il coturno della ciabatta, and La nemica by Dario Niccodemi. His Rita of  Cascia prompted complaints from Italian president Oscar Luigi Scalfaro.

Well into his eighties, he continued performing on stage, most recently in Sillabari  by Goffredo Parise and Aquiloni, taken from Giovanni Pascoli.

Works

Theatre 
1958 - Finale di partita from Samuel Beckett
1959 - Sorveglianza speciale, from Jean Genet
1960 - Mamma voglio il cerchio
1960 - Il novellino, from Masuccio Salernitano
1962 - Il Diavolo
1963 - Paolo Paoli, from Arthur Adamov
1964 - Il mondo d'acqua, from Aldo Nicolaj
1964 - Il candelaio, Paolo Poli and Ida Omboni, taken from Giordano Bruno
1965 - Un Milione from Sergio Tofano
1966 - Rita da Cascia
1967 - Il suggeritore nudo, from Filippo Tommaso Marinetti
1968 - La nemica, from Dario Niccodemi
1968 - Brasile, starring Marco Messeri
1969 - Tito Andronico, starring Marco Messeri
1969 - La rappresentazione di Giovanni e Paolo
1969 - Carolina Invernizio
1970 - La vispa Teresa
1971 - Soirée Satie
1971 - L'uomo nero
1972 - Giallo!!!, Ida Omboni and Paolo Poli
1973 - Apocalisse
1975 - Femminilità
1976 - Rosmunda, from Vittorio Alfieri, starring Marco Messeri
1978 - Mezzacoda
1979 - Mistica, taken from Antonio Fogazzaro
1980 - Il Morino, Bruno Carbocci, starring Marco Messeri
1981 - Paradosso, from Denis Diderot, Aldo Palazzeschi and Guido Gozzano
1982 - Bus, taken from Esercizi di stile from Raymond Queneau
1983 - Magnificat
1985 - Cane e gatto, from Aldo Palazzeschi, Tommaso Landolfi, Riccardo Bacchelli and Alberto Moravia
1986 - Farfalle, from Guido Gozzano
1988 - I legami pericolosi, from Choderlos de Laclos, starring Milena Vukotic
1990 - Il coturno e la ciabatta, from Alberto Savinio
1992 - La leggenda di San Gregorio, from Hartmann von Aue
1994 - L'asino d'oro, from Apuleius
1997 - I viaggi di Gulliver (Gulliver's Travels), from Jonathan Swift starring Pino Strabioli
1999 - Caterina de Medici, taken from La Reine Margot, Alexandre Dumas
2000 - Il tranello di Medusa, from Erik Satie
2001 - Aldino mi cali un filino, d'Aldo Palazzeschi
2002 - Jacques il fatalista (Jacques le fataliste et son maître), de Denis Diderot
2004 - Il ponte di San Luis Rey, from Thornton Wilder
2006 - Sei brillanti, from Mura (Maria Volpi Nannipieri), Paola Masino, Irene Brin, Camilla Cederna, Natalia Aspesi and Elena Gianini Belotti
2007 - Favole, from Charles Perrault and Jeanne-Marie Leprince de Beaumont
2008 - Sillabari, from Goffredo Parise
2010 - Il Mare, from Anna Maria Ortese 
2012 - Aquiloni, taken from Giovanni Pascoli

Television 
 Souper, director Vito Molinari, 1960
 Tutto da rifare pover'uomo, telefilm director Eros Macchi, 1960
 Ricordati di Cesare, starring Dory Dorika, Elsa Merlini, Aldo Silvani, Federico Collino, Paolo Poli, Mila Sannoner, director Alessandro Brissoni, 1962
 Champignol senza volerlo, director Silverio Blasi, 1963
 Gli equivici di una notte, form Oliver Goldsmith, director Edmo Fenoglio, 1964
 Chi non-prova non-ci crede, director Carlo Di Stefano, 1968
 Il Re non-fa per me, director de Massimo Scaglione en 1969
 Babau 70, variety of Ida Omboni and Paolo Poli, director Vito Molinari; 1970, stopped from RAI and acted in 1976 only, starring Marco Messeri, Laura Betti, Adriana Asti, Camilla Cederna, Umberto Eco, Fabrizio De André
 Al Cavallino Bianco, operetta, 1974
 La strana storia del dottor White e del signor Black, mini-telefilm, director Norman Mozzato en 1975
 The Three Musketeers mini-telefilm; director Sandro Sequi, 1976, starring Marco Messeri, Lucia Poli and Milena Vukotic
 Scene La Crisalide from the mini-telefilm Racconti di fantascienza, director Alessandro Blasetti, 1979.

Filmography 
 The Two Orphans (1954, director Giacomo Gentilomo) - Pierre Frochard
 The Lovers of Manon Lescaut (1954, director Mario Costa) - Tiberge
 Non c'è amore più grande (1955, director Giorgio Bianchi)
 Camping (1958, director Franco Zeffirelli)
 Cronache del '22, scene Giorno di paga (1961, director Guidarino Guidi)
 Per amore... per magia... (1967, director Duccio Tessari) - Jo Babà
 H2S (1969, director Roberto Faenza) - Anna Mazzamauro
 L'asino d'oro: processo per fatti strani contro Lucius Apoleuus cittadino romano (1970, director Sergio Spina) - Genesio
 La piazza vuota (1971, director Beppe Recchia)
 Le braghe del padrone (1978, director Flavio Mogherini) - Il diavolo

Books 
 Ida Omboni and Paolo Poli, Rita da Cascia, Milano Libri, Milan 1967.
 Ida Omboni and Paolo Poli, Carolina Invernizio, Milano Libri, Milan 1970.
 Paolo Poli, Telefoni bianchi e camicie nere (with pièces' text L'uomo nero et Femminilità de Ida Omboni et Paolo Poli), Garzanti, Milan 1975.
 Ida Omboni and Paolo Poli, Giallo!, Arnoldo Mondadori Editore, Milan 1977.
 Ida Omboni and Paolo Poli, Mistica..., Editori del Grifo, Montepulciano 1980.
 Ida Omboni and Paolo Poli, Giuseppe Giuseppe! - filastroccario verdiano, Editori del Grifo, Montepulciano 1981.

Bibliography 
 Rodolfo di Gianmarco, Paolo Poli, Gremese Editore, Rome, 1985.
 Andrea Pini, Paolo Poli. L’amore gay nell’Italia del dopoguerra fino a oggi, Pride (Revue) n. 66, December 2004.
 Eva Marinai, Gobbi, dritti e la satira molesta. Copioni di voci, immagini di scena (1951-1967), ETS, Pisa 2007.
 Andrea Jelardi, Queer Tv-omosessualità e trasgressione nella tv italiana, introduction of Carlo Freccero, Croce, Rome, 2006.
 Interview to Paolo Poli (Gianluca Meis writer) page about Poli in: Andrea Jelardi, In scena en travesti-Il Travestitismo nello spettacolo italiano, Croce, Rome, 2009.
 Paolo Poli, Siamo tutte delle gran bugiarde. Conversazioni con Giovanni Pannacci, Giulio Perrone Editore, Rome, 2009, 
 Il Radiocorriere, different years

Gallery

References

External links 

 
  Poliscena Association: Paolo Poli's Theatre
  Il mare of Paolo Poli

1929 births
2016 deaths
Italian male film actors
Actors from Florence
Italian male stage actors
Italian male television actors